Robert Henry Halbert (October 31, 1870 – October 11, 1943) was a Canadian agrarian activist and politician. He was president of the United Farmers of Ontario from 1915 to 1918 and was elected to the House of Commons of Canada in a 1919 by-election as an independent candidate in Ontario North. He was re-elected in the 1921 federal election as a United Farmers of Ontario MP and subsequently joined the caucus of the Progressive Party of Canada. He was defeated in the 1925 federal election in Muskoka—Ontario.

References

External links

1870 births
1943 deaths
Independent MPs in the Canadian House of Commons
United Farmers of Ontario MPs
Members of the House of Commons of Canada from Ontario
Canadian farmers